Caldy Rugby Football Club is an English rugby union team which play in the Championship, the second tier of English rugby, following their promotion from National League 1 at the end of 2021-22. Their home stadium is Paton Field in Thurstaston.

On 23 April 2022 Caldy reached the highest level in the club's history when they beat title rivals Sale 13–9 in front of a crowd of 3,000 at Paton Field to win National League 1 and gain promotion to the RFU Championship (tier 2) for the 2022–23 season.

Honours
 National Old Boys Sevens Winners: 1970–71
 Cheshire Cup winners (6): 1971, 2011, 2012, 2013, 2015, 2017
 North West 2 champions: 1997–98
 South Lancs/Cheshire 1 champions: 2002–03
 North Division 2 West champions: 2004–05
 North Division 1 champions: 2006–07
 National League 2 North champions (2): 2016–17, 2019–20
 National League 1: champions 2021–2022

Current standings

International players
  Ben Johnston (England) 
  Chris Bentley (England Under 21) 
  Andy Maxwell (England)
  Gavin Kerr (Scotland)
  Shaun Woof (England Under 21)
  Gavin Woods (England Counties)
  Stuart Turner (England)
  Sam Dickinson (England Saxons)
  Elliot Gourlay (Scotland Under 20)
   Rhys Björn Hayes (Sweden Rugby)
  Andy Darlington (Netherlands)

References

External links
 Official Website

English rugby union teams
Rugby clubs established in 1924
Sport in the Metropolitan Borough of Wirral